Camponotus sexguttatus is a species of ant in the family Formicidae.

Subspecies
 Camponotus sexguttatus albotaeniolatus Forel, 1921
 Camponotus sexguttatus antiguanus Wheeler, 1923
 Camponotus sexguttatus basirectus Wheeler, 1923
 Camponotus sexguttatus biguttatus Emery, 1894
 Camponotus sexguttatus decorus (Smith, 1858)
 Camponotus sexguttatus fusciceps Emery, 1906
 Camponotus sexguttatus montserratensis Wheeler, 1923
 Camponotus sexguttatus ornatus Emery, 1894
 Camponotus sexguttatus perturbans Kutter, 1931
 Camponotus sexguttatus sexguttatus (Fabricius, 1793)
 Camponotus sexguttatus unitaeniatus Wheeler, 1923

References

 Hansson C, Lachaud J, Pérez-Lachaud G (2011). "Entedoninae wasps (Hymenoptera, Chalcidoidea, Eulophidae) associated with ants (Hymenoptera, Formicidae) in tropical America, with new species and notes on their biology". ZooKeys 134: 62–82.

Further reading

 Arnett, Ross H. (2000). American Insects: A Handbook of the Insects of America North of Mexico. CRC Press.

sexguttatus
Insects described in 1793